Colt .45 (also known as The Colt Cousins) is an American Western series, originally starring Wayde Preston, which aired on ABC between October 1957 and September 1960.

The half-hour program is loosely based on the 1950 Warner Bros. film of the same name, starring Randolph Scott. Colt .45 was part of the William T. Orr-produced array of Westerns that Warner produced for ABC in the late 1950s and early 1960s.

Overview
Roy Huggins developed the series with Wayde Preston in the part of undercover government agent Christopher Colt, who takes the cover of a traveling Old West pistol salesman, hence the title of the series. Colt .45 also featured fictionalizations of actual historical characters, including Edwin Booth (brother of John Wilkes Booth, the assassin of U.S. President Abraham Lincoln), Sam Bass, Billy the Kid, Lew Wallace, Judge Roy Bean, Buffalo Bill Cody, Ned Buntline, and Calamity Jane.

During this period, Colt .45 was one of several ABC/WB Western productions, along with Cheyenne, Sugarfoot, Lawman, Maverick, and Bronco. Various series leads occasionally did crossover episodes on some of the other WB programs. One of the most imaginative was the "Hadley's Hunters" episode of Maverick, in which Bart Maverick (Jack Kelly) comes upon Christopher Colt's sales satchel, abandoned in a room and covered with dust, as the series had been cancelled the previous season.

In 1958, series star Wayde Preston left the series because he claimed he was made to do stunts that required a stunt man. Preston was also reportedly unhappy with the show's low budget, which caused other problems. Because of Preston's departure, producers were forced to air repeats of the series along with a few new episodes to complete the 1958–1959 season.

In 1959, Donald May assumed the lead role as Sam Colt, Jr., the cousin of Christopher Colt. After leaving the series, Warner Bros. prevented Preston from obtaining other acting jobs. He eventually returned briefly to the series, but was demoted to a co-starring role with May. Due to the casting changes, the series was eventually marketed in the United Kingdom as The Colt Cousins.

Guest stars

Chris Alcaide
Rayford Barnes
Russ Bender
Dan Blocker
Nesdon Booth
Lane Bradford
Charles Bronson
Peter Brown
Stephen Chase
Don Chastain
John Cliff
Fred Coby
Robert Conrad
Kathleen Crowley
Alan Dexter
Angie Dickinson
Troy Donahue 
John Doucette
Richard Garland
Sean Garrison
Jock Gaynor
Robert Griffin

Alan Hale Jr.
Tom Hennesy
Robert 'Buzz' Henry
Bern Hoffman
Rodolfo Hoyos Jr.
I. Stanford Jolley
Stacy Keach Sr.
Sandy Koufax
Britt Lomond
Jimmy Lydon
Herbert Lytton
Walter Maslow
Leonard Nimoy
James Nolan
Gilman Rankin
Lyle Talbot
Guy Teague
Kelly Thordsen
John Vivyan
Max Wagner
Adam West
Margaret Whiting

Series overview

Episodes

Season 1: 1957–58

Season 2: 1959

Season 3: 1959–60

Reception and cancellation

Upon its debut in October 1957, Colt .45 was a respectable ratings draw for ABC. It helped ABC win its timeslot against NBC and CBS.

By season two, however, behind the scenes problems caused a dip in viewership. After series star Wayde Preston left the series due his dissatisfaction with working conditions, producers were forced to repeat episodes to fill out the second season. There were also problems with the show's sponsorship which changed repeatedly. According to author Alvin H. Marill, the choice to cast Donald May in the lead role after Preston's departure was not explained in the storyline. Wayde Preston eventually returned to the series but by then, ratings had dropped off and ABC canceled the series in 1960. The final episode aired on 27 September 1960.

Production notes

Theme song
The Colt .45 opening theme music was composed by Hal Hopper with lyrics by Douglas Heyes.

Merchandising

The TV show was adapted into a comic strip by Dan Spiegle, distributed by Dell Comics.

References

External links

 
 
 Colt .45 at The Classic TV Archive

1957 American television series debuts
1960 American television series endings

1950s Western (genre) television series
1960s Western (genre) television series
American Broadcasting Company original programming
Black-and-white American television shows
Cultural depictions of Abraham Lincoln
Cultural depictions of Buffalo Bill
Cultural depictions of Calamity Jane
English-language television shows
Period television series
Television shows adapted into comics
Live action television shows based on films
Television series by Warner Bros. Television Studios
Television series created by Roy Huggins